John Humphery ( – 28 September 1863) was a British Whig politician.

Humphery became a Whig MP for Southwark at the 1832 general election and held the seat until the 1852 general election, when he did not seek re-election.

References

External links
 

UK MPs 1832–1835
UK MPs 1835–1837
UK MPs 1837–1841
UK MPs 1841–1847
UK MPs 1847–1852
Whig (British political party) MPs for English constituencies
1790s births
1863 deaths
Year of birth uncertain